WXLJ-LP (97.7 FM) was a radio station licensed to serve East Harwich, Massachusetts.  The station is owned by Cape Cod Christian Broadcasting. It aired a Christian rock music format.

The station was assigned the WXLJ-LP call letters by the Federal Communications Commission (FCC) on January 14, 2003.  The station received its license to cover in April 2005 but in February 2008 there was a published report that not only was the station not currently on the air but that there was "no sign of a transmitting antenna around the house where it is supposedly located." The station's license was canceled by the FCC on October 18, 2010 for failure to file for renewal.

References

External links
 

XLJ-LP
Defunct radio stations in the United States
XLJ-LP
XLJ-LP
Defunct religious radio stations in the United States
Radio stations disestablished in 2010
Radio stations established in 2003
2003 establishments in Massachusetts
2010 disestablishments in Massachusetts
Harwich, Massachusetts